Station P is an ocean measurement site, located at 50 degrees north latitude, 145 degrees west longitude (water depth, 4220 meters).

The site was established by the US Navy in 1943.  In 1951, US funding to maintain continual presence ran out and observational responsibility was passed to Canada.  The site was staffed continuously until 1981.  Starting in 2007, automated observations have been made by the National Oceanic and Atmospheric Administration.

References

Oceanography
Meteorological data and networks